Matej Dybala (born 16 July 1999) is a Slovak football defender who plays for German club VfB Auerbach.

Club career

ŠKF Sereď
Dybala made his professional Fortuna Liga debut for iClinic Sereď against Zemplín Michalovce on 4 May 2019.

MAS Táborsko
In September 2019, Dybala joined MAS Táborsko.

References

External links
 
 
 Futbalnet profile 

1999 births
People from Bytča
Sportspeople from the Žilina Region
Living people
Slovak footballers
Slovakia youth international footballers
Association football defenders
Partizán Bardejov players
ŠKF Sereď players
FC Silon Táborsko players
MŠK Považská Bystrica (football) players
VfB Auerbach players
Slovak Super Liga players
2. Liga (Slovakia) players
Czech National Football League players
Oberliga (football) players
Slovak expatriate footballers
Expatriate footballers in the Czech Republic
Slovak expatriate sportspeople in the Czech Republic
Expatriate footballers in Germany
Slovak expatriate sportspeople in Germany